The 33rd District of the Iowa Senate is located in eastern Iowa, and is currently composed of Linn County.

Current elected officials
Rob Hogg is the senator currently representing the 33rd District.

The area of the 33rd District contains two Iowa House of Representatives districts:
The 65th District (represented by Liz Bennett)
The 66th District (represented by Art Staed)

The district is also located in Iowa's 1st congressional district, which is represented by Ashley Hinson.

Past senators
The district has previously been represented by:

John W. Patton, 1965–1966
James Potgeter, 1967–1970
John Tapscott, 1971–1972
George F. Milligan, 1973–1974
Philip B. Hill, 1975–1978
Julia Gentleman, 1979–1982
Donald Gettings, 1983–1992
William D. Palmer, 1993–1998
Jeff Lamberti, 1999–2002
Jack Hatch, 2003–2012
Rob Hogg, 2013–present

See also
Iowa General Assembly
Iowa Senate

References

33